UB7 may refer to:

 UB7, a postcode district in the UB postcode area
 SM UB-7, World War I German submarine